The 2018 New Hampshire gubernatorial election took place on November 6, 2018, to elect the governor of New Hampshire. Incumbent Republican Governor Chris Sununu won re-election to a second term, defeating former state senator Molly Kelly. Sununu was the first incumbent Republican to win reelection as governor since Steve Merrill was reelected in 1994.

Primary elections were held on September 11, 2018. The gubernatorial election was coincident with races for the state legislature and the United States House of Representatives.

Background
New Hampshire is one of only two states, along with Vermont, where governors are elected to two-year terms. Republican Chris Sununu was elected in the 2016 election.

Republican primary

Candidates

Declared
 Chris Sununu, incumbent governor

Polling

Results

Democratic primary

Candidates

Declared
 Molly Kelly, former state senator
 Steve Marchand, former mayor of Portsmouth and candidate for governor in 2016

Declined
 Dan Feltes, state senator
 Chris Pappas, Executive Councilor (running for NH-01)
 Colin Van Ostern, former executive councilor and nominee for governor in 2016 (running for Secretary of State)
 Andru Volinsky, Executive Councilor

Polling

Results

Libertarian primary

Candidates

Declared
 Aaron Day, former chair of the Free State Project and independent candidate for the U.S. Senate in 2016
 Jilletta Jarvis, former secretary of the Libertarian Party of New Hampshire and independent candidate for governor in 2016

Results

General election

Predictions

Endorsements

Polling

with Steve Marchand

with Chris Sununu and generic Democrat

with generic Republican and Democrat

with Mark Connolly

with Sununu and Van Ostern

Results

Results by county

References

External links
Candidates at Vote Smart
Candidates at Ballotpedia

Official campaign websites
Jilletta Jarvis (L) for Governor
Molly Kelly (D) for Governor
Chris Sununu (R) for Governor

gubernatorial
New Hampshire
New Hampshire gubernatorial elections